Oerlinghausen Airfield , known as Oerlinghausen Segelflugplatz (Oerlinghausen gliding airfield) is a small airfield situated in the town of Oerlinghausen, close to Bielefeld in the North Rhine-Westphalia region of Germany. With around 25,000 glider take-offs each year it is one of the largest gliding centres, comparable with Lasham Gliding Society in the United Kingdom. It is home to 13 gliding clubs and a gliding school. It is also used by powered aeroplanes, microlights and hot air balloons.

External links
  Airport operator's official website

Buildings and structures in Lippe
Airports in North Rhine-Westphalia
Bielefeld